Eucalyptus eudesmioides, commonly known as mallalie, desert gum or mallabie is a species of mallee that is endemic to Western Australia. It is a rounded, bushy mallee with smooth bark, egg-shaped to heart-shaped leaves arranged in opposite pairs, club-shaped flower buds arranged in groups of three, whitish flowers and cylindrical to barrel-shaped fruit.

Description
It usually has smooth white to grey or brownish bark, sometimes with a rough, fibrous grey to brown bark near the base of the trunk. Flowering occurs from February to May and the flowers are white.

Taxonomy and naming
Eucalyptus eudesmioides was first formally described in 1860 by the botanist Ferdinand von Mueller, initially as Eucalyptus eudesmoides in his book Fragmenta phytographiae Australiae. The original name is an orthographical variant of E. eudesmioides.

The specific epithet (eudesmioides) is a reference to the Eucalyptus subgenus Eudesmia. The ending -oides is a Latin suffix meaning "likeness".

Mallalie is the Noongar name for the species.

Distribution and habitat
The range extends from Carnarvon in the Gascoyne south to Wongan Hills in the Wheatbelt region of Western Australia. It grows in sandy soil on flat or low sloping areas in mallee woodland. It is one of the eucalypts identified in the Eurardy Reserve, a reserve that was established as a bush heritage property in 2011.

Two subspecies, not yet formally described, are recognised by the Australian Plant Census:
 Eucalyptus eudesmioides subsp. Pallida;
 Eucalyptus eudesmioides subsp. Selachiana.

Conservation status
This eucalypt is classified as "not threatened" by the Western Australian Government Department of Parks and Wildlife.

See also
List of Eucalyptus species

References

Trees of Australia
Eucalypts of Western Australia
Myrtales of Australia
eudesmoides
Mallees (habit)
Plants described in 1860
Taxa named by Ferdinand von Mueller